Bambao may refer to:

Sultanate of Bambao
Bambao Mtrouni
Boeni ya Bambao